David William Jarrett (born 19 April 1952) is an English schoolmaster who was the first man to win cricket Blues for both Cambridge University and Oxford University. He attended Wellington College before matriculating at the University of Oxford.

Cricket career
Born in Bromsgrove, Worcestershire, Jarrett attended Wellington College, in Berkshire, where he played in the First XI, leading the batting in his final year, 1969, with 493 runs at an average of 37.92. He went up to Worcester College, Oxford, and played two seasons as a middle-order batsman in the Oxford cricket team. He achieved only moderate success, but won his Blue in 1975 and played a match-saving innings of 35 in the second innings against Cambridge after Oxford had lost five wickets cheaply. A few weeks later he began studies at St Catharine's College, Cambridge. In his first match for Cambridge, in April 1976, he made his highest first-class score, 62, after Cambridge had lost their first five wickets for 23 on the first morning against Essex. In the 1976 University match he made 56 in 190 minutes in the second innings in a vain attempt to deny Oxford victory. That was his last first-class match. He also won a hockey Blue at Cambridge.

He played a few matches for Worcestershire Second XI in 1976 and 1977, scoring a century against Yorkshire Second XI at Headingley in 1976. He played Minor Counties cricket for Bedfordshire in 1978 and 1981.

Teaching career
Jarrett taught Classics for 20 years at Bedford School, where he was also master-in-charge of cricket. In 1997 he became headmaster at Reed's School in Cobham, Surrey, and served in that position until his retirement in 2014. In 1996 Reed's was ranked 671st in the national league tables for independent schools; by 2011 it had risen to 88th. He also raised the standard of cricket at Reed's, where an indoor cricket centre has been named in his honour.

He and his wife Anne have two children.

References

External links
 David Jarrett at Cricinfo
 David Jarrett at CricketArchive

1952 births
Living people
Sportspeople from Bromsgrove
People educated at Wellington College, Berkshire
Alumni of Worcester College, Oxford
Alumni of St Catharine's College, Cambridge
English cricketers
Oxford University cricketers
Cambridge University cricketers
Bedfordshire cricketers
Schoolteachers from Worcestershire